Anti-Corruption Bureau, Andhra Pradesh, abbreviated as ACB. This agency is a specialised in fighting corruption in various departments of the Government against Public Servants and Private Persons who abet the offences under the Prevention of Corruption Act, 1988. It is established on 2 January 1961. Senior I.P.S. Officer Shri Pendyala Sitharama Anjaneyulu is the current Director General of the Andhra Pradesh Anti Corruption Bureau, .As the Andhra Pradesh government on 8 November had withdrawn the 'general' consent that was given to the members of the Delhi Special Police Establishment (DSPE) to carry out search and operations in the state without informing the government ACB has to play a great role in A. P.

See also
 Corruption in India
 Government of Andhra Pradesh

References

State agencies of Andhra Pradesh
Anti-corruption agencies
1961 establishments in Andhra Pradesh
Anti-corruption measures in India
Corruption in Andhra Pradesh
Organisations based in Vijayawada
Government agencies established in 1961